Victoria Hall can refer to:

Canada
 Victoria Hall (Cobourg), a town hall in Ontario
 Victoria Hall (Ontario), a commercial building
 Victoria Hall (Westmount), Quebec

United Kingdom
 Victoria Hall (Ealing), a grade II listed public hall in Ealing, west London
 Victoria Hall, Saltaire, a grade II* listed building and concert hall in Saltaire, West Yorkshire, England
 Victoria Hall, Settle, a concert hall in Settle, North Yorkshire, England
 Victoria Hall, Sheffield, a Methodist church in England
 Victoria Hall, Stoke-on-Trent, a concert hall in England
 Victoria Hall, Sunderland, site of the Victoria Hall disaster

Other countries

Alphabetised by country
 Victoria Hall (Fremantle), a theatre in Western Australia
 Victoria Public Hall, Chennai, a heritage building in India
 Victoria Hall, a student residence at Queen's University at Kingston, Jamaica
 Victoria Hall (Geneva), Switzerland, a concert hall
 Victoria Hall (Pittsburgh), Pennsylvania, U.S., a landmark
 Victoria Hall (Montevideo), Uruguay, a theatre

See also
 Victoria Theatre and Concert Hall, Singapore
 Victoria Theatre (disambiguation)